Wildcat Hill Provincial Park is a wilderness park in north-eastern Saskatchewan approximately 40km from Hudson Bay. It is located amongst the Pasquia Hills, south of Highway 55, and west of Highway 9. The 21,752-hectare park was established as a protected area in 1971, and became a provincial park in 1992.
 
The main attractions of Wildcat Hill Provincial Park are hunting and snowmobiling. The snowmobile trails in the park are part of a 684.14 km-network of trails maintained by the Hudson Bay Trail Riders. In addition to the groomed trails, there are also many kilometres of unmaintained trails.

Moose, white-tailed deer, wolves, american black bear, coyotes, and cougar are commonly found inside the park. In addition to hunting, fishing can be done in the park at Bankside Lake, Firhead Lake, Fir River, and Pasquia River.

Park access 
While not accessible by car, the park is reachable by ATV or snowmobile.

See also
List of protected areas of Saskatchewan
Tourism in Saskatchewan

References 

Provincial parks of Saskatchewan
Hudson Bay No. 394, Saskatchewan
Division No. 14, Saskatchewan